Kazakhstan competed at the 2014 Summer Youth Olympics, in Nanjing, China from 16 August to 28 August 2014.

Archery

Kazakhstan qualified a female archer from its performance at the 2013 Asian Archery Championships.

Individual

Team

Athletics

Kazakhstan qualified six athletes.

Qualification Legend: Q=Final A (medal); qB=Final B (non-medal); qC=Final C (non-medal); qD=Final D (non-medal); qE=Final E (non-medal)

Boys
Track & road events

Field Events

Girls
Track & road events

Field events

Beach Volleyball

Kazakhstan qualified a boys' and girls' team by their performance at the AVC Qualification Tournament.

Boxing

Kazakhstan qualified four boxers based on its performance at the 2014 AIBA Youth World Championships

Boys

Girls

Canoeing

Kazakhstan qualified two boats based on its performance at the 2013 World Junior Canoe Sprint and Slalom Championships.

Boys

Girls

Cycling

Kazakhstan qualified a boys' and girls' team based on its ranking issued by the UCI.

Team

Mixed Relay

Fencing

Kazakhstan qualified one athlete based on its performance at the 2014 FIE Cadet World Championships.

Boys

Mixed Team

Gymnastics

Artistic Gymnastics

Kazakhstan qualified two athletes based on its performance at the 2014 Asian Artistic Gymnastics Championships.

Boys

Girls

Rhythmic Gymnastics

Kazakhstan qualified one individual and one team based on its performance at the 2014 Asian Rhythmic Championships.

Individual

Team

Trampoline

Kazakhstan qualified one athlete based on its performance at the 2014 Asian Trampoline Championships.

Judo

Kazakhstan qualified two athletes based on its performance at the 2013 Cadet World Judo Championships.

Individual

Team

Modern Pentathlon

Kazakhstan qualified one athlete based on its performance at the Asian and Oceania YOG Qualifiers and another based on the 1 June 2014 Olympic Youth A Pentathlon World Rankings.

Shooting

Kazakhstan was given a wild card to compete.

Individual

Team

Swimming

Kazakhstan qualified three swimmers.

Boys

Girls

Table Tennis

Kazakhstan qualified a male athlete based on its performance at the Road to Nanjing series. Later Kazakhstan qualified a female athlete based on its performance at the Asian Qualification Event.

Singles

Team

Qualification Legend: Q=Main Bracket (medal); qB=Consolation Bracket (non-medal)

Taekwondo

Kazakhstan qualified one athlete based on its performance at the Taekwondo Qualification Tournament.

Boys

Triathlon

Kazakhstan qualified one athlete based on its performance at the 2014 Asian Youth Olympic Games Qualifier.

Individual

Relay

Weightlifting

Kazakhstan qualified 2 quotas in the boys' events and 2 quotas in the girls' events based on the team ranking after the 2013 Weightlifting Youth World Championships.

Boys

Girls

Wrestling

Kazakhstan qualified four athletes based on its performance at the 2014 Asian Cadet Championships.

Boys

Girls

References

2014 in Kazakhstani sport
Nations at the 2014 Summer Youth Olympics
Kazakhstan at the Youth Olympics